Storm på Lugna gatan is the SVT Christmas Calendar for 2018.

Cast 
Adrian Macéus – Leo
Maja Söderström – Vilja
Cecilia Forss – Sanna
Henrik Johansson – Trond
Wilma Lidén – Evin
Johan Rheborg – Eskil
Linus Wahlgren – Sten
Shima Niavarani – Mika
Sofia Ledarp – Malva
Ulla Skoog – Gudrun
Olof Wretling – Sven
Lena Philipsson – Lussan
Edvin Ryding – Sylvester
Eric Stern – Simon
Happy Jankell – Freja
Christoffer Holmberg – Hembot

References

External links 
 

2018 Swedish television series debuts
2018 Swedish television series endings
Sveriges Television's Christmas calendar
Television shows set in Sweden